The Hawker 800 is a mid-size twinjet corporate aircraft. It is a development of the British Aerospace BAe 125, and was assembled by Hawker Beechcraft.

Development
In April 1981, the British Aerospace board sanctioned the programme to improve the British Aerospace 125-700 series. By May 1983 the new aircraft was ready for its first test flight.

The BAe 125-800 series has a number of modifications and changes over the 700, the most noticeable being the redesigned cockpit windscreen. Accompanying this are a modified rear fuselage fairing, as well as a glass cockpit and uprated (from 3,700 to 4,300 lb thrust) Garrett TFE731-5R-1H engines. British Aerospace also improved the wing by incorporating new outer wing sections. This helped to reduce drag and improve aerodynamic efficiency.

The 125-800 series would become a sales success. From the first BAe 125 flight in August 1961 it took nineteen years until the 500th airframe was sold. In a little over five years, British Aerospace were registering the 200th sale of the 800 series.

In 1994 Raytheon (which bought Beech Aircraft Corporation in 1980) acquired Corporate Jets. The new entity being known as Raytheon Aircraft. In March 2007, Raytheon divested its aircraft manufacturing business to Hawker Beechcraft Corp., a company formed and controlled by GS Capital Partners and Onex Partners of Canada.

The last version was the Hawker 850XP, which was certified for operation in March 2006. This version also incorporates upgraded avionics and a redesigned interior. The Hawker 850XP essentially fills the gap left behind by the Hawker 1000 when production of that aircraft ceased.

Two new variants were announced in October 2006 for future deliveries:
 The Hawker 750, in which the ventral fuel tank is replaced by an externally accessed baggage pannier, which reduces range slightly.
 The , using new Honeywell TFE731-50BR engines for increased range

After the 2013 bankruptcy of Hawker Beechcraft, the surviving company, Beechcraft, discontinued its business jet range, including the 800 series, although the designs are still supported for parts.

By 2018, a 1980s-era 700s was priced for less than $500,000, a 1995 800A at $1.02 million and a 2012 900XP at $6 million.

Design

The Hawker 800 was similar to most modern airframes in requiring sub-assemblies to be constructed away from the final point of manufacture. The fuselage sections, wings and control surfaces were manufactured and assembled in the United Kingdom in a combination of Hawker Beechcraft's own facility and those owned by Airbus UK, which inherited much of BAE Systems's civil aircraft manufacturing capacity. These sections are partially fitted out and installed with control surfacing and major systems before being shipped to Hawker Beechcraft's main manufacturing site in Wichita, Kansas for final assembly, fitting out and testing.

Military variants
Japan uses a maritime search and rescue variant of the Hawker 800. It is designated the U-125A in Japan Air Self-Defense Force service.  This variant has large observation windows, a flare and marker-buoy dispenser system, life-raft and emergency equipment dropping system and enhanced salt water corrosion prevention. The aircraft also has a Toshiba 360-degree search radar, Melco thermal imaging equipment and other military communications equipment for its mission.

A military version of the Hawker 800XP is in use by South Korea for tactical aerial reconnaissance, surveillance and SIGINT (SIGnals INTelligence) tasks, and 8 specially equipped aircraft were delivered in 2000. The Republic of Korea Air Force calls them RC-800s, and they are based at Seoul Air Base.

Variants

 Hawker 750

With 48 built, this lower-cost, lighter-weight and shorter-range version of the 800XP competes with the Citation XLS and Learjet 60.
In November 2017, used prices range from $2.2 million for early 2008 models to 3.8 million for late 2011 models.
Its  ventral fuel tank is replaced with a  external baggage compartment, leaving  of fuel in the wet wings.
The cockpit has four-screen Rockwell Collins Pro Line 21 avionics and FMS-6000.

B-checks are every 800 h, C-checks every 1,600 h and D-checks every 3,200 h and there are yearly maintenance checks.
The landing gear is overhauled every 12 years.
Its  Honeywell TFE731-5BR have 2,100 h  and 4,200 h  inspection intervals, extendable to 2,500 h / 5,000 h with optional service bulletins, and MSP per engine.

 Hawker 800
 Hawker 800XP

Able to fly nine passengers over 2,400 nmi, 475 Hawker 800XP have been sold for $10–13.5 million between 1995 and 2005. By July 2018, 467 were still in service, valued $1.4–2.4 million.
 Hawker 800XP Pro Line
 Hawker 800XPi
 Hawker 850XP
 Hawker 900XP
 U-125
 RC-800
 C-29

Operators

Civil operators
The aircraft is operated by private individuals, companies and executive charter operators, and in fractional ownership programs.

Military operators

 Japan Air Self-Defense Force

 Mozambique Air Force

 Nigerian Air Force

 Pakistan Navy

 Philippine Air Force

 Republic of Korea Air Force

Accidents and incidents
 31 July 2008: A Hawker 800 registered as N818MV and operated by East Coast Jets as Flight 81, crashed while attempting a go-around at Owatonna Degner Regional Airport near Owatonna, Minnesota, killing all eight passengers and crew on board. The aircraft was manufactured in 1991, and East Coast Jets began operating it in June 2003. The NTSB determined the probable cause of the accident was the captain’s decision to attempt a go-around late in the landing roll with insufficient runway remaining. Contributing to the accident were (1) the pilots’ poor crew coordination and lack of cockpit discipline; (2) fatigue, which likely impaired both pilots’ performance; and (3) the failure of the FAA to require crew resource management training and standard operating procedures for Part 135 operators.
 10 November 2015: A Hawker 800 operating as ExecuFlight Flight 1526 crashed into an apartment complex in Akron, Ohio shortly before 15:00 EST in rainy weather while on approach to Akron Fulton International Airport. Witnesses reported hearing a loud explosion, and seeing smoke/flames as the crash occurred. All nine occupants of the aircraft, including both pilots, were killed. The National Transportation Safety Board reported the crash was caused by pilot error, operational issues within the charter company, and deficiencies in the FAA's oversight (operations inspections) of the charter operator.
 20 December 2020: A Hawker 800XP crashed near Farmingdale, New York. At 8:35 p.m. EST the aircraft faced substantial damage; the captain sustained minor injuries, and the first officer was seriously injured. The plane was a Part 91 business flight operated by Talon Air, LLC as a Title 14 CFR.

Specifications (Hawker 800)

See also

References
Notes

Bibliography
  Gunston, Bill. Hawker: The story of the 125. (Airworthy Publications International Limited, 1996)

External links

 Hawker Official product page
 Farnborough 2012 Day 3 News Aviation Week pp52–53 tells the history of the 125/800
 Hawker 800XP Jet specifications and performance data

Hawker 0800
Raytheon Company products
1990s United States business aircraft
Twinjets
Low-wing aircraft
Aircraft first flown in 1983
Cruciform tail aircraft